The following is a list of events relating to television in Ireland from 2023.

Events
1 January – RTÉ New Years Eve celebrations include Jennifer Zamparelli hosting a New Year’s Eve Party, from 10.15pm on RTÉ One which is followed by the NYE Countdown Concert with Westlife from the new festival village on North Wall Quay.
 1 February – An Irish version of the Challenge television station launches on Saorview.
 3 February – Wild Youth are selected to represent Ireland in the 2023 Eurovision Song Contest with their song "We Are One". 
 16 March – Ryan Tubridy announces that he will be stepping down as the presenter of The Late Late Show after 14 years.
 26 May – Ryan Tubridy presents his final edition of The Late Late Show.

Debuts
30 January – Upfront with Katie Hannon on  RTÉ One
TBD –  Love in the Country on  RTÉ Two
TBD – High Road, Low Road on  RTÉ One
9 February  –  Lady Gregory, Ireland's First Social Influencer, on  RTÉ One
TBD – Page Turners on  RTÉ Two
TBD – Neven’s Greenway Food Trails on  RTÉ One

Ending this year
9 February- Eco Eye

Ongoing television programmes

1960s
 RTÉ News: Nine O'Clock (1961–present)
 RTÉ News: Six One (1962–present)
 The Late Late Show (1962–present)

1970s
 The Late Late Toy Show (1975–present)
 The Sunday Game (1979–present)

1980s
 Fair City (1989–present)
 RTÉ News: One O'Clock (1989–present)

1990s
 Would You Believe (1990s–present)
 Winning Streak (1990–present)
 Prime Time (1992–present)
 Nuacht RTÉ (1995–present)
 Nuacht TG4 (1996–present)
 Reeling In the Years (1999–present)
 Ros na Rún (1996–present)
 Virgin Media News (1998–present)
 Ireland AM (1999–present)
 Telly Bingo (1999–present)

2000s
 Nationwide (2000–present)
 Virgin Media News (2001–present) – now known as the 5.30
 Against the Head (2003–present)
 news2day (2003–present)
 Other Voices (2003–present)
 The Week in Politics (2006–present)
 At Your Service (2008–present)
 Operation Transformation (2008–present)
 Two Tube (2009–present)

2010s
 Room to Improve (2007–present)
 Jack Taylor (2010–present)
 Mrs. Brown's Boys (2011–present)
 MasterChef Ireland (2011–present)
 Today (2012–present)
 The Works (2012–present)
 Second Captains Live (2013–present)
 Ireland's Fittest Family (2014–present)
 The Restaurant (2015–present)
 Red Rock (2015–present)
 First Dates (2016–present)
 Dancing with the Stars (2017–2020, 2022–present)
 The Tommy Tiernan Show (2017–present)

2020s
 DIY SOS: The Big Build Ireland (2020–present)
 The Style Counsellors (2020–present)
 Smother (2021–present)

References

2023 in Irish television